Ghost Lab is a weekly American paranormal television series that premiered on October 6, 2009, on the Discovery Channel. Produced by Paper Route Productions and Go Go Luckey Entertainment, the program is narrated by Mike Rowe. It follows ghost-hunting brothers Brad and Barry Klinge, who founded Everyday Paranormal (EP) in October 2007.

Everyday Paranormal is a paranormal investigation team whose stated mission is to "visit the most haunted places in America, find evidence, and test new theories to probe the existence of the afterlife" using a fringe-scientific approach.

In addition to Brad and Barry, the team included members Steve Harris, Hector Cisneros, and Katie Burr. Other members included Jason Worden, Ashlee Lehman (Formerly Ashlee Hillhouse), and Steve Hock. Ghost Lab remains the name of EP's mobile command center.

On October 14, 2009, Brad and Barry Klinge were interviewed on The Pat & Brian Show about the origins of Everyday Paranormal, current investigations, and equipment use. On October 30, 2009, Larry King interviewed the brothers via satellite on CNN's Larry King Live.

Team members
Everyday Paranormal (E.P.) founders and presidents Brad and Barry Klinge investigated alongside their "on-air" Ghost Lab team which included: Katie Burr (Investigator), Hector Cisneros (Investigator-season 1), Steve Harris (Tech Manager) Steve Hock (Ghost Lab Ops), and newest member Cory Lamey (Team Trainee).

Other Everyday Paranormal members included: Ashlee Hillhouse (Investigator), Jason Worden (Investigator/Affiliate Ops Director), and Jenn Hitt (Website/PR Events).

Production

Equipment and techniques used
During investigations, the team used various investigation equipment, including thermographic cameras, infrared cameras, digital audio recorders, data loggers, EMF meters, laser thermometers, motion detectors, and EVP recorders, as well as a mobile command center called the Ghost Lab, which featured interactive computer monitors, noise filtering audio programs, and various high tech gear. The team also used a variety of paranormal theories to test out some of their techniques during an investigation.

Episodes

Season 1 (2009)

Season 2 (2010–11)
On March 25, 2010, the Klinge Brothers announced through a YouTube video that Ghost Lab will return for a second season consisting of 13 episodes. Season 2 premiered on Tuesday, October 19, 2010.

Season two aired on Saturday at 2 a.m. EST on the Discovery Channel. Reruns of both seasons air weekday nights on the Science Channel.

{{Episode table |background=#000080|overall=5 |title=20 |aux1=30 |airdate=18 |aux1T=Location(s) |episodes=

{{Episode List
 |EpisodeNumber=18
 |Title=Theme Park of Death
 |Aux1=Lake Shawnee Fun Park, Princeton, West Virginiaprivate residence, West Virginia
 |OriginalAirDate=
 |ShortSummary=E.P. investigates Lake Shawnee Fun Park in Princeton, West Virginia an abandoned amusement park with a tragic past that was built on a Native American burial ground, and a private residence in West Virginia's coal country. 
 |LineColor=000080
}}

}}

Release

BroadcastGhost Lab originally aired on the Discovery Channel Thursday nights at 10:00 p.m. until it was moved to Friday late-nights/Saturday early-mornings due to low viewer ratings. Each episode started out with a text stating: "The Klinge brothers are investigating..." with Brad and Barry conducting a "head-cam" walkthrough around reportedly haunted locations before they continued with the whole team investigation.

In 2010, Ghost Lab was canceled after the conclusion of its second season.

Home videoGhost Lab appears on the compilation DVD entitled Paranormal: Haunts and Horrors. This DVD is produced by the Discovery Channel. The episode is "If Walls Could Talk" (S1-E13), in which the Klinge Brothers investigated the Lemp Mansion; it is the first episode on this DVD.

The Discovery Channel also released two more DVD titles: Ghost Lab: Volume 1, which features the first three episodes of Season 1 ("Disturbing the Peace", "Tombstone", and "Smell of Fear"), and Ghost Lab: Pursuit Of The Paranormal, which features more episodes from Season 1.

See also
 List of ghost films
 List of reportedly haunted locations in the world

References

External links
 of Ghost Lab''
 of Everyday Paranormal

Discovery Channel original programming
Paranormal reality television series
2000s American reality television series
2010s American reality television series
2009 American television series debuts
2011 American television series endings